This is a following list of the MTV Movie Award winners and nominees for Best Movie. From 2012 to 2018, it was renamed to Movie of the Year. The Lord of the Rings Trilogy won in three consecutive years (2002–2004) and is the only franchise who took home “Movie of the Year” for all their films. The Twilight Saga films won in four consecutive years (2009–2012), along with Best Kiss.

Winners and nominees

1990s

2000s

2010s

2020s

References

Movie
Awards for best film